A persistence framework is middleware that assists in the storage and retrieval of information between applications and databases, especially relational databases. It acts as a layer of abstraction for persisted data, bridging conceptual and technical differences between storage and utilisation.

Many persistence frameworks are also object-relational mapping (ORM) tools (e.g.  Hibernate, MyBatis SQL Maps,  Apache Cayenne, Entity Framework, Slick, and Java Ultra-Lite Persistence). Such frameworks map the objects in the application domain to data that needs to be persisted in a database. The mappings can be defined using either XML files or metadata annotations.

External links 

 What is Persistence Framework? Rose India